"Bella" is a song by Congolese-French singer and rapper Gims. It was released on 6 May 2013 as the third single off his album Subliminal.

Background 
In an interview, Gims said that he started working on the song in 2009.

Music video 
The music video was shot in Marbella, Andalusia, Spain and was released on the same day as the song's release. The video had gained 500 million views until June 2021.

Charts

Certifications

References 

2013 singles
2013 songs
French-language songs
Gims songs
Songs written by Renaud Rebillaud
Songs written by Gims
Songs written by Maska (rapper)